Yoma is a genus of nymphalid butterflies.

Species
In alphabetical order:
 Yoma algina (Boisduval, 1832) (New Guinea and surrounding islands)
 Yoma sabina (Cramer, [1780]) – Australian lurcher (widespread from Southeast Asia to Australia)

References

External links
Images representing Yoma at Consortium for the Barcode of Life

Junoniini
Butterfly genera
Taxa named by William Doherty